The 2002 Nokia Brier was the Canadian men's curling championship. It was held from March 9 to 17, 2002 at the Pengrowth Saddledome in Calgary, Alberta. It was won by the Albertan foursome headed by Randy Ferbey. Ferbey threw third stones throughout the tournament while his mate (third) David Nedohin threw skip (or fourth) stones. The other two members of the team were second Scott Pfeifer and lead Marcel Rocque.

The Ferbey team beat the young Ontario foursome of John Morris, Joe Frans, Craig Savill, and Brent Laing by a score of 9–4. The game's pivotal moment came when Ferbey scored four points in the fifth end to break open an otherwise even and low-scoring game.

Third place in the tournament went to the team skipped by New Brunswick's Russ Howard, while fourth place was taken by Saskatchewan's Scott Bitz.

Absent from the event were many of the top teams in the country who had boycotted the Brier in favour of the Grand Slam of Curling series, protesting the lack of prize money.

Teams

Round-robin standings

Round-robin results
All draw times are listed in Mountain Standard Time (UTC−7).

Draw 1
Saturday, March 3, 1:30 pm

Draw 2
Saturday, March 3, 7:00 pm

Draw 3
Sunday, March 4, 9:00 am

Draw 4
Sunday, March 4, 1:30 pm

Draw 5
Sunday, March 4, 7:30 pm

Draw 6
Monday, March 5, 9:00 am

Draw 7
Monday, March 5, 1:30 pm

Draw 8
Monday, March 5, 7:30 pm

Draw 9
Tuesday, March 6, 9:00 am

Draw 10
Tuesday, March 6, 1:30 pm

Draw 11
Tuesday, March 6, 7:30 pm

Draw 12
Wednesday, March 7, 9:00 am

Draw 13
Wednesday, March 7, 1:30 pm

Draw 14
Wednesday, March 7, 7:30 pm

Draw 15
Thursday, March 8, 9:00 am

Draw 16
Thursday, March 8, 1:30 pm

Draw 17
Thursday, March 8, 7:30 pm

Playoffs

3 vs. 4
Friday, March 9, 1:30 pm

1 vs. 2
Friday, March 9, 7:30 pm

Semifinal
Saturday, March 10, 1:30 pm

Final
Sunday, March 11, 1:30 pm

Statistics

Top 5 player percentages
Round Robin only

Team percentages
Round Robin only

Awards and honours
As always, there were a scattering of individual awards at the competition, though they were not (and in fact, are still not) considered important by fans, media, or players, as the team element of the game of curling is held in such esteem. The bonspiel's All-Stars were as follows (First Team All-Stars followed by Second Team All-Stars):

The MVP Award, called the "Hec Gervais Award" went to David Nedohin.

See also
Curling
Canadian Curling Association
Scott Tournament of Hearts
World Curling Championships

References

The Brier
Curling competitions in Calgary
Nokia Brier
2002 in Alberta